On 26 February 2023, an explosion occurred in the Rakhni market of Barkhan district, Balochistan, killing at least four people and injuring 14 others.

Background 
The blast was caused by an IED planted on a motorcycle and detonated remotely. Videos of the aftermath were circulated on social media, but no group has claimed responsibility for the attack. The incident follows a series of attacks in KP and areas bordering Afghanistan by the Tehrik-i-Taliban Pakistan, which has intensified its activities since talks broke down in November 2022.

Pakistani officials, including the Balochistan Chief Minister and the Interior Minister, have condemned the attack and called for greater action against terrorist groups.

References

2023 in Balochistan, Pakistan
2020s crimes in Balochistan, Pakistan
2020s murders in Pakistan
Insurgency in Balochistan
February 2023 events in Pakistan
Terrorist incidents in Pakistan in 2023